The double-exchange mechanism is a type of a magnetic exchange that may arise between ions in different oxidation states. First proposed by Clarence Zener, this theory predicts the relative ease with which an electron may be exchanged between two species and has important implications for whether materials are ferromagnetic, antiferromagnetic, or exhibit spiral magnetism. For example, consider the 180 degree interaction of Mn-O-Mn in which the Mn "eg" orbitals are directly interacting with the O "2p" orbitals, and one of the Mn ions has more electrons than the other. In the ground state, electrons on each Mn ion are aligned according to the Hund's rule:

If O gives up its spin-up electron to Mn4+, its vacant orbital can then be filled by an electron from Mn3+. At the end of the process, an electron has moved between the neighboring metal ions, retaining its spin. The double-exchange predicts that this electron movement from one species to another will be facilitated more easily if the electrons do not have to change spin direction in order to conform with Hund's rules when on the accepting species. The ability to hop (to delocalize) reduces the kinetic energy. {{Citation needed|date={{subst:CURRENTMONTHNAME}} {{subst:CURRENTYEAR}}}}  Hence the overall energy saving can lead to ferromagnetic alignment of neighboring ions.

This model is superficially similar to superexchange. However, in superexchange, a ferromagnetic or antiferromagnetic alignment occurs between two atoms with the same valence (number of electrons); while in double-exchange, the interaction occurs only when one atom has an extra electron compared to the other.

References

External links
 Exchange Mechanisms in E. Pavarini, E. Koch, F. Anders, and M. Jarrell: Correlated Electrons: From Models to Materials, Jülich 2012, 

Quantum chemistry
Magnetic exchange interactions

es:Doble canje